Daniel Walcott (born February 19, 1994) is a Canadian ice hockey defenceman/forward. He is currently playing within the Tampa Bay Lightning organization in the National Hockey League. (NHL) Walcott was selected by the New York Rangers in the 5th round (140th overall) of the 2014 NHL Entry Draft.

Playing career
Walcott committed to and played at Lindenwood University, playing in the 2012–13 season. Walcott would switch to major junior hockey a season later in the Quebec Major Junior Hockey League during the 2014–15 QMJHL season, while playing with the Blainville-Boisbriand Armada, Walcott was rewarded for his outstanding play when he was named to the QMJHL First All-Star Team.

On June 1, 2015, Walcott was traded from the New York Rangers to the Tampa Bay Lightning in exchange for a seventh round draft pick in the 2015 NHL Entry Draft, which was initially sent to Tampa Bay in the Martin St. Louis trade the previous season. Walcott had just finished his second season in Quebec Major Junior Hockey League with the Blainville-Boisbriand Armada. Walcott had seven goals and 41 points in 54 regular season games. He additionally appeared in one American Hockey League game with the Hartford Wolf Pack after signing an amateur tryout agreement.

On September 17, 2015, Walcott signed a three-year entry-level contract with the Lightning.

During the 2017–18 season while playing with the Syracuse Crunch, the Lightning's AHL affiliate, he was the team's nominee for the IOA/American Specialty AHL Man of the Year.

On June 7, 2018, Walcott renewed his contract with the Lightning, signing a one-year, two-way deal. Prior to the 2018–19 season, Walcott was injured with the Lightning in the pre-season forcing him to miss the majority of the year. He missed 71 games with an injured shoulder before returning to play 5 games with the Crunch in the AHL.

On June 19, 2019, Walcott was re-signed to a one-year, two-way extension to remain within the Lightning organization. On December 20, 2019, while playing for the Crunch, he was given a two-game suspension for abusive language towards an opponent.

For the 2019–20 season, Walcott was the Crunch's nominee for the IOA/American Specialty AHL Man of the Year for the third time in his career.

On April 17, 2020, Walcott was re-signed to a one-year, two-way extension with the Lightning organization.

On March 9, 2021, Walcott was re-signed to a two-year, two-way extension with the Lightning organization. On April 6, 2021, Walcott earned his first NHL recall with the Lightning, being assigned to the Lightning's taxi squad. On May 10, 2021, Walcott made his NHL debut with the Lightning in a game against the Florida Panthers.

On December 16, 2022, Walcott set the record for most games played with the Syracuse Crunch, with 335 career games played with the Crunch, surpassing Brad Moran.

Career statistics

Awards and honours

References

External links

1994 births
Living people
Blainville-Boisbriand Armada players
Canadian ice hockey defencemen
Greenville Swamp Rabbits players
Hartford Wolf Pack players
Lindenwood Lions men's ice hockey players
New York Rangers draft picks
Syracuse Crunch players
Tampa Bay Lightning players